The Fellowship of the Australian Academy of Science is made up of about 500 Australian scientists.

Scientists judged by their peers to have made an exceptional contribution to knowledge in their field may be elected to Fellowship of the Academy. Fellows are often denoted using the post-nominal FAA (Fellow of the Australian Academy of Science).

A small number of distinguished foreign scientists with substantial connections to Australian science are elected as Corresponding Members.

Fellows are appointed for life; this table also contains deceased fellows.

Fellows

Corresponding Members

References
Australian Academy of Science. Fellowship list

External links
http://www.asap.unimelb.edu.au/asap_inf.htm – Australian Science Archives Project
From http://www.asap.unimelb.edu.au/bsparcs/aasmemoirs AAS Biographical Memoirs (1966–1996)
From http://www.sciencearchive.org.au

From https://www.science.org.au

 
 
Australian Academy of Science
Australian Academy of Science
fellows of the Australian Academy of Science